Sharon Catherine Brown (born January 11, 1962), also known as Sharon Catherine Blanks, is an American actress of stage, film, and television.

Early life 
She was born in New York City and is the daughter of actor Johnny Brown, who portrayed Nathan Bookman on the 1970s sitcom Good Times. Her mother, June Brown, was a studio manager. Sharon graduated from Hollywood High School where she played Mame Dennis in the musical Mame and Ruth Sherwood in Wonderful Town. She has a brother, John Brown Jr.

Career 
Brown has worked frequently as a stage actress, including roles as Effie in both Broadway and touring productions of the musical Dreamgirls; as Violet in the musical Maggie Flynn; and as the narrator in versions of Joseph and the Amazing Technicolor Dreamcoat. She has also toured with productions of The Wiz, Rent and Jekyll & Hyde. Brown was nominated for a Helen Hayes Award in 1987 for Outstanding Lead Actress in a Non-Resident Production for her role in the touring version of Dreamgirls.

Film credits include A Chorus Line (1985), For Keeps (1988), Sister Act 2 (1993), What's Love Got to Do with It (1993), Blues Brothers 2000 (1998) and Introducing Dorothy Dandridge (1999). On television, Brown played the character Daisy on the CBS soap opera Love of Life in 1971, and she originated the role of Chantel on the NBC soap Generations from 1989 to 1990. She portrayed a young Louise in a 1981 flashback episode of The Jeffersons titled "And the Doorknobs Shined Like Diamonds". Other episodic television credits include Good Times, A Different World and The Fresh Prince of Bel-Air.

Personal life 
She married Billy Blanks Jr., the son of Tae Bo fitness personality Billy Blanks. They taught at fitness studios in Sherman Oaks, California, and developed a series of fitness videos.  In 2014, Blanks pitched the program to Shark Tank and accepted a deal.  They have an adopted son named Elijah. They are divorced.

Filmography

Film

Television

References

External links 

1962 births
Living people
Actresses from New York City
American soap opera actresses
American stage actresses
American film actresses
American television actresses
American exercise instructors
21st-century American actresses